Zhang Nan (died 222 A.D.), courtesy name Wenjin, was a military officer of the state of Shu Han in the Three Kingdoms period of China.

Life
Zhang Nan was originally from Jing Province (covering present-day Hubei and Hunan). He served as a military officer under Liu Bei, the founding emperor of the state of Shu Han in the Three Kingdoms era, and accompanied him to Yi Province (covering present-day Sichuan and Chongqing) in the early 210s.

In 221, Liu Bei attacked his former ally, Sun Quan (the founding emperor of Eastern Wu), after the latter broke their alliance and seized his territories in Jing Province and executed his general Guan Yu. Zhang Nan participated in this campaign, which led to the Battle of Xiaoting (or Battle of Yiling) of 221–222, and was appointed as the Vanguard of the Shu army. In the summer of 222, Sun Quan's forces, led by Lu Xun, suddenly launched a counter-attack after about six months of stalemate since the beginning of 222. Zhang Nan was killed in action.

The Shu official Yang Xi praised Zhang Nan for his courage and mentioned that he faced the same fate as Feng Xi.

See also
 Lists of people of the Three Kingdoms

References

 Chen, Shou (3rd century). Records of the Three Kingdoms (Sanguozhi).
 Pei, Songzhi (5th century). Annotations to Records of the Three Kingdoms (Sanguozhi zhu).
 Sima, Guang (1084). Zizhi Tongjian.

Year of birth unknown
222 deaths
Shu Han generals
Three Kingdoms people killed in battle